The 1956 South American Championships in Athletics  were held in the Chilean capital, Santiago, between 14 and 22 April.

Medal summary

Men's events

Women's events

Medal table

External links
 Men Results – GBR Athletics
 Women Results – GBR Athletics
 Medallists

S
South American Championships in Athletics
International athletics competitions hosted by Chile
1956 in South American sport
1956 in Chilean sport